The Gildersleeve Mine, in Lolo National Forest near Superior in Mineral County, Montana, was a gold and barite mine listed on the National Register of Historic Places in 2002.

The listed  area included nine contributing buildings, two contributing sites, two contributing structures, and a contributing object.  These include:
cook / main house, a  one-story frame building 
bunkhouse 
little house / office 
blacksmith shop and drying area 
two outhouses
meat house
chicken coop
wood shed
mine adit
water system
mining equipment
tailings pile

It was deemed notable as "the most complete depression-era mining camp remaining in western Montana.  Located within the Cedar Creek Historic Mining District, the Gildersleeve mine is the heart of a family-run hard rock mining operation established and run by the Gildersleeve family of Superior, Montana. It is a unique mining community built atop tailings from late 19th-century mining activities."

The complex also supported U.S. Forest Service activity.

References

National Register of Historic Places in Mineral County, Montana
Buildings and structures completed in 1931
1931 establishments in Montana
Blacksmith shops
Lolo National Forest
Barium
Gold mines in the United States
Mines in Montana